Tage Henriksen (8 April 1925 – 13 May 2016) was a Danish rower who competed in the 1948 Summer Olympics. He was born in Roskilde. In 1948 he was a crew member of the Danish boat which won the gold medal in the coxed pair event. He died in 2016.

References

1925 births
2016 deaths
People from Roskilde
Danish male rowers
Olympic rowers of Denmark
Rowers at the 1948 Summer Olympics
Olympic gold medalists for Denmark
Olympic medalists in rowing
Medalists at the 1948 Summer Olympics
European Rowing Championships medalists
Sportspeople from Region Zealand